Csaba Balog (born 24 October 1972 in Törökszentmiklós) is a Hungarian football (midfielder) player who has spent most of his career playing for Zalaegerszegi TE.

External links
Player profile at HLSZ 

1972 births
Living people
People from Törökszentmiklós
Hungarian footballers
Association football midfielders
Nagykanizsai SC footballers
Szombathelyi Haladás footballers
Zalaegerszegi TE players
FC Ajka players
Hévíz FC footballers
Sportspeople from Zala County